Common Wall Media is an independent record label, film production, and media company based in Mesa, Arizona. It is owned and operated by Chuckie Duff, former Dear and the Headlights bassist and current co-owner of Flying Blanket Recording.

History

During his time as both a local musician and while working as co-owner of Flying Blanket Recording with music producer Bob Hoag, Chuckie Duff created strong connections within the Arizona music scene. While some of these connections led to his own musical success in Dear and the Headlights, they also developed relationships that have allowed him to promote and release records that are gaining national attention. For example, Common Wall Media artist Gospel Claws was featured on NPR, and Snake! Snake! Snakes!'s self-titled EP was the ninth most-added record on college radio.

Common Wall's distribution deal with Modern Arts Records has also significantly helped in increasing the exposure that each of its bands receive.

Common Wall Media has also branched out beyond music to produce a short film titled Cost of Living.  The film starred Brandon Routh, Mary Elizabeth Winstead and Bret Harrison.

Bands 
 Before Braille
 Bogan Via
 Dear and the Headlights
 El Sonida de Reposa
 Fine China
 The Foxglove Hunt
 Future Loves Past
 Gospel Claws
 The Reflection
 Snake! Snake! Snakes!
 The Through & Through Gospel Review

Discography

Filmography

References

External links
 Official Website

American independent record labels
Indie rock record labels
Record labels based in Arizona
Companies based in Mesa, Arizona